Benjamin Barrington, D.D. (1713-1774) was Dean of Armagh from 1764 to 1768

Barrongton was born in Dublin and educated at Trinity College, Dublin.  He became Rector of Armagh in 1759. He died on 19 October 1774.

References

1764 deaths
1713 births
Christian clergy from Dublin (city)
Deans of Armagh
18th-century Irish Anglican priests
Alumni of Trinity College Dublin